Nickelodeon is a Greek free-to-air television channel that was launched on 3 September 2010. It was available free-to-air in the Athens area on 35 analog UHF signal broadcast from Hymettus, before the analog switch off on 20 July 2012, but it is available through the Digea DVB-T digital consortium, on 54 UHF signal broadcast from Aegina, Hymettus and Parnitha. It also broadcasts in Thessaloniki and its surrounding areas through Nickelodeon Plus, a version of the channel for the Northern Greece area. Nickelodeon HD started officially broadcasting on 17 October 2011 via Cosmote TV. As with MTV, Restis Enterprises was involved in launching Nickelodeon in Greece. Nickelodeon was originally a block on Channel 9 from 2003 to 2008.

Programming

Animated
Alvinnn!!! and the Chipmunks (Ο Άλβιν και η παρέα του)
Big Nate
Dragon Ball Super
Endangered Species (Τριπλός Μπελάς)
Fanboy & Chum Chum
Get Blake! (Ο Μπλέικ και οι εξωγήινοι σκίουροι)
It's Pony
Kamp Koral: SpongeBob's Under Years
Kung Fu Panda: Legends of Awesomeness
Middlemost Post
Ninjago
Pig Goat Banana Cricket
Rainbow Butterfly Unicorn Kitty
Regal Academy
Rise of the Teenage Mutant Ninja Turtles
Robot and Monster (Το Ρομπότ και το Τέρας)
Rugrats
SpongeBob SquarePants
The Adventures of Jimmy Neutron, Boy Genius
The Casagrandes
The Fairly OddParents
The Loud House
The Patrick Star Show
The Penguins of Madagascar
The Smurfs
Transformers: EarthSpark
Winx Club
Yo-kai Watch

Live-action
Cousins for Life
Game Shakers
Henry Danger
Max & Shred
Nicky, Ricky, Dicky & Dawn
The Thundermans
Wendell & Vinnie

TeenNick (23:00-06:00)
Big Time Rush
Drake & Josh
iCarly
Sam & Cat (Σαμ & Κατ)
True Jackson, VP
Victorious
Zoey 101

Films
A Fairly Odd Christmas
A Fairly Odd Movie: Grow Up, Timmy Turner!
Best Player
Big Time Movie
Nicky Deuce
One Crazy Cruise
Rags
Santa Hunters
Splitting Adam
Swindle
The Boy Who Cried Werewolf

Nick Jr.
Abby Hatcher
Baby Shark's Big Show!
Blaze and the Monster Machines
Blue's Clues & You!
Bubble Guppies
Butterbean's Café
Dora and Friends: Into the City! (Η Ντόρα και οι φίλοι της: Περιπέτειες στην πόλη)
Dora the Explorer
Fresh Beat Band of Spies
Kiva Can Do (Η Κίβα μπορεί)
Lalaloopsy
Little Charmers
Nella the Princess Knight (Νέλλα, η Πριγκίπισσα Ιππότης)
PAW Patrol
Pinocchio and Friends (Πινόκιο και Φίλοι)
Rusty Rivets
Ryan's Mystery Playdate
Santiago of the Seas
Shimmer and Shine (Σίμερ και Σάιν)
Team Umizoomi
Teletubbies
The Adventures of Paddington
Zack & Quack (Ζακ και Κουάκ)

Events
Slime Cup

Former series
Aaahh!!! Real Monsters
All Grown Up!
As Told by Ginger (Όπως λέει η Τζίντζερ)
Avatar: The Last Airbender
Back at the Barnyard
Blue's Clues (Τα Στοιχεία της Μπλου)
Breadwinners
Bucket & Skinner's Epic Adventures (Οι Περιπέτειες των Μπάκετ και Σκίννερ)
CatDog
Catscratch
ChalkZone
Chop Chop Ninja
Danny Phantom
Dinofroz
Double Dare
El Tigre
Go, Diego, Go! (Πάμε, Ντιέγκο, Πάμε!)
Gormiti Nature Unleashed
Harvey Beaks
Hero Factory
Hey Arnold!
How to Rock
Kenan & Kel
Legends of the Hidden Temple
Life with Boys
Little Bill
Monsters vs. Aliens (Τέρατα και Εξωγίηνοι)
Monsuno
Mr. Meaty
My Family's Got Guts
My Life as a Teenage Robot
My Little Pony: Friendship Is Magic
Oh Yeah! Cartoons
Planet Sheen
Rabbids Invasion
Rocket Monkeys
Rocket Power
Rocko's Modern Life
Sanjay and Craig (Σάντζεϋ & Κρεγκ)
Super 4
Tak and the Power of Juju (Ο Τακ και οι Δυνάμεις των Τζουτζου)
Team Hot Wheels
Teenage Mutant Ninja Turtles (Χελωνονιντζάκια)
The Angry Beavers
The Brothers García
The Legend of Korra
The Mighty B! (Η Τρομερή Μπι!)
The Naked Brothers Band
The Wild Thornberrys
The X's
Transformers: Rescue Bots
T.U.F.F. Puppy
Unfabulous
Wonder Pets! (Σούπερ Ζωάκια)
Yakkity Yak
Zorro: The Chronicles (Τα Χρονικά του Ζορρό)

References

External links

Greece
Greek-language television stations
Television channels and stations established in 2010
Television channels in Greece
Television channels in Cyprus
Mass media in Athens
Children's television networks
2003 establishments in Greece
2008 disestablishments in Greece
2010 establishments in Greece